Avery Hill is a mountain in Barnstable County, Massachusetts. It is located on southeast of Bourne in the Town of Bourne. Pine Hill is located south of Avery Hill.

References

Mountains of Massachusetts
Mountains of Barnstable County, Massachusetts